Tetraglenes nimbae is a species of beetle in the family Cerambycidae. It was described by Lepesme in 1952.

References

Agapanthiini
Beetles described in 1952